Mimi Zeiger is a Los Angeles–based architecture and design critic, educator, and curator. She is the author of New Museums: Contemporary Museum Architecture Around the World (2005), Tiny Houses (Random House, 2009), Micro Green: Tiny Houses in Nature (Rizzoli, 2011), and Tiny Houses in the City (Rizzoli, 2016). Zeiger was co-curator (with Ann Lui and Niall Atkinson) of the United States pavilion of the 2018 Venice Architecture Biennnale and editor of the accompanying catalogue Dimensions of Citizenship: Architecture and Belonging from the Body to the Cosmos (Inventory Press, 2018). Her writing about architecture, art, design, and urbanism has appeared in the New York Times, Metropolis, Dwell, Domus, Dezeen, and Architectural Review. She is a graduate of SCI-Arc (MA) and earned her Bachelor of Architecture degree from Cornell University. Zeiger teaches in the Media Design Practices MFA program of the Art Center College of Design and is visiting faculty at the Southern California Institute of Architecture.

Notes

External links 

 Official website
 Dimensions of Citizenship website

American architecture writers
Architecture critics
Design writers
American magazine editors
American curators
American women curators
Women magazine editors
Cornell University alumni
Cornell University College of Architecture, Art, and Planning alumni
Southern California Institute of Architecture alumni
Writers from Los Angeles
21st-century American women writers